Ricardo Julián Martinez Pavón or simply Ricardo Martínez (born 18 February 1984 in Asunción), is a Paraguayan defender who currently plays for Club Nacional in the Paraguayan Primera División.

Career
Martinez played for Atlético Minero in 2008 having previously played for Libertad in Paraguay and had a short loan spell with Chilean side Deportes Concepción. He last played for Peruvian side Sporting Cristal.

References

External links
 atletico.com.br

1984 births
Living people
Paraguayan footballers
Paraguayan expatriate footballers
Club Libertad footballers
Deportes Concepción (Chile) footballers
Clube Atlético Mineiro players
Sporting Cristal footballers
Expatriate footballers in Brazil
Expatriate footballers in Chile
Expatriate footballers in Peru
Association football central defenders